William Nickolas Earl Knott (July 23, 1920 – April 12, 1987) was a Canadian professional ice hockey player who played 19 games in the National Hockey League for the Brooklyn Americans during the 1941–42 season. He also played several seasons in the United States Hockey League, and retired in 1950. He was born in Kingston, Ontario.

Career statistics

Regular season and playoffs

External links

1920 births
1987 deaths
Canadian ice hockey defencemen
Brooklyn Americans players
Ice hockey people from Ontario
Sportspeople from Kingston, Ontario
Oshawa Generals players
Pittsburgh Hornets players
Springfield Indians players